Wood Green (Old Bescot) railway station was a railway station that opened on the Grand Junction Railway in 1837. It served the Wood Green area of Wednesbury and Walsall. It closed in 1941. It was located near to where junction 9 of the M6 motorway has been located since the late 1960s.

First station
It opened as Bescot Bridge on 4 July 1837, and was the Grand Junction Railway's main station for Walsall and Wednesbury being located between the two towns. The station was also known as Walsall station and this is how it was initially called in Bradshaw's guides. There is some confusion as to the station name and on what dates it changed.

The station was a second class station and therefore not all the trains stopped there, in 1837 there were two trains in each direction, by 1839 there were four trains in each direction that stopped.

It would appear that Walsall provided the most passengers as a light van ran between the station and the town.

Second station
Wood Green (Old Bescot) station was opened by the London and North Western Railway on the same site on 1 February 1881.

The station had two platforms, one either side of the double running line, both platforms were access from the road overbridge, there were no goods facilities, the station only dealt with passengers and parcels.

The station closed on 5 May 1941. The line remains open.

References

Notes

Citations

Bibliography

Further reading

Disused railway stations in Walsall
Former London and North Western Railway stations
Railway stations in Great Britain opened in 1837
Railway stations in Great Britain closed in 1941